This is a list of major sport stadiums in Paraguay.

Cities

Luque
 Paraguayan Olympic Committee Olympic Stadium (Luque)
 Estadio Feliciano Caceres (Luque)

Asunción
 Jockey Club (Asunción)
 Secretaria Nacional de Deportes Arena (Asunción)
 Secretaria Nacional de Deportes (Asunción)
 Estadio Defensores del Chaco (Asunción)
 Estadio General Pablo Rojas (Asunción)
 Estadio Manuel Ferreira (Asunción)
 Estadio Arsenio Erico (Asunción)
 Estadio Roberto Bettega (Asunción)
 Estadio Tigo La Huerta (Asunción)
 Estadio Rogelio Livieres (Asunción)
 Estadio Bernabé Pedrozo (Asunción)

Pedro Juan Caballero
 Monumental Río Parapití (Pedro Juan Caballero)

Atyrá
 Estadio Agustín Baez (Atyrá)

Itauguá
 Estadio Juan Canuto Pettengill (Itauguá)

Ciudad del Este
 Estadio Antonio Aranda (Ciudad del Este)
 Estadio R.I. 3 Corrales (Ciudad del Este)
 Estadio Sol del Este (Ciudad del Este)

Minga Guazú
 Estadio Paí Coronel (Mingua Guazú)

Encarnación
 Centro de Alto Rendimiento Deportivo del Sur Olympic Stadium (Encarnación)
 Estadio Hugo Stroessner (Encarnación)
 Estadio Club 22 de Setiembre (Encarnación)

San Estanislao
 Estadio Juan José Vázquez (San Estanislao)

Coronel Oviedo
 Estadio Ovetenses Unidos (Coronel Oviedo)

Carapeguá
 Estadio Municipal de Carapegua (Carapeguá)

See also
 List of sports venues in Asunción
 List of stadiums by capacity
 List of South American stadiums by capacity
 List of association football stadiums by capacity

References

Stadiums

Stadium
Paraguay
 
stadiums